George Coe (born George Julian Cohen; May 10, 1929 – July 18, 2015) was an American actor. He was a cast member for the first season of Saturday Night Live and voiced the character of Woodhouse in Archer.

Early life
Coe was born in Jamaica, Queens, New York.

Career
His Broadway theater career began in 1957 and included turns as "M. Lindsey Woolsey" opposite Angela Lansbury in the original production of Mame; as "Owen O'Malley" in On The Twentieth Century, and creating the role of David in the original Broadway production of Company.

Coe was an original member of the "Not Ready For Prime Time Players", the original cast of Saturday Night Live.  He was only credited as a cast member for the first show, October 11, 1975. Coe was used in several other episodes of SNL, but was never again credited.

In 1979 he appeared as the head of Dustin Hoffman's character's advertising firm in the Academy Award-winning Kramer vs. Kramer. Coe was nominated for an Academy Award for the 1968 short film The Dove, a parody of Ingmar Bergman's films, which he also co-directed. Coe also played the role of Brigadier General Scott Watson in the 1986 movie Remo Williams: The Adventure Begins. He guest-starred on a 1991 episode of Star Trek: The Next Generation. He also portrayed Ben Cheviot, the eventual head of Network 23, on the series Max Headroom. His various television appearances include Murder, She Wrote, Bones, My Wicked, Wicked Ways: The Legend of Errol Flynn, Judging Amy, The King of Queens, Nip/Tuck, Grey's Anatomy, Columbo, Curb Your Enthusiasm, Gilmore Girls, The Golden Girls, Wilfred, and as Senator Howard Stackhouse in two episodes of The West Wing.

He voiced the character of Woodhouse, the much-put-upon valet in the FX animated series Archer. He voiced the Autobot Wheeljack in Michael Bay's Transformers: Dark of the Moon. Coe provided voice acting for the video games The Elder Scrolls V: Skyrim, Star Wars: The Old Republic, and Guild Wars 2.

Death
Coe died on July 18, 2015, at the age of 86, after a long illness, in Santa Monica, California. The eighth season of Archer (the primary arc of which revolves mostly around the death of his character Woodhouse) was dedicated to him.

Acting credits

Film

Television

Video games

Theatre

Accolades

See also
 History of Saturday Night Live (1975–1980)

References

External links

1929 births
2015 deaths
Male actors from New York City
American male film actors
American male musical theatre actors
American male voice actors
American male television actors
Hofstra University alumni
American Academy of Dramatic Arts alumni
20th-century American male actors
21st-century American male actors
People from Jamaica, Queens